Čelovce may refer to:

 Čelovce, Prešov District, Slovakia
 Čelovce, Veľký Krtíš District, Slovakia